The 2018 AFL season is the 122nd season in the Australian Football League contested by the Sydney Swans.

Squad for 2018
Statistics are correct as of end of 2016 season.
Flags represent the state of origin, i.e. the state in which the player played his under 18 football.

For players: (c) denotes captain, (vc) denotes vice-captain, (lg) denotes leadership group.
For coaches: (s) denotes senior coach, (cs) denotes caretaker senior coach, (a) denotes assistant coach, (d) denotes development coach.

Playing list changes

The following summarises all player changes between the conclusion of the 2015 season and the beginning of the 2016 season.

In

Out

References

Sydney Swans seasons
Sydney